Chianni is a comune (municipality) in the Province of Pisa in the Italian region Tuscany, located about  southwest of Florence and about  southeast of Pisa.

Its territory includes vast chestnut woods and cultivations of vine and olive trees.

Chianni borders the following municipalities: Casciana Terme Lari, Castellina Marittima, Lajatico, Riparbella, Santa Luce, Terricciola.

History
Before being under the rule of Florence, the medieval town of Chianni was fought over by the bishop of Volterra and the Republic of Pisa. One of the largest attractions is the Chapel della Compagnia della Santissima Annuziata, hosting "beautiful frescoes by Giovanni Battista Tempesti."

References

External links
 Official website
 

Cities and towns in Tuscany